ZNGB-FM is an adult contemporary radio station in Nassau, Bahamas.  Somewhat uniquely, the station has two internet feeds on its website: one for Nassau, and one for Freeport.

External links 
 

Radio stations in the Bahamas
Adult contemporary radio stations